Flint Mountain Football Club (formerly Halkyn & Flint Mountain F.C.) is a Welsh football team based in Pentre Halkyn, Flintshire.  The team currently play in the Ardal NW, which is at the third tier of the Welsh football league system.

History
The club was formed in 2009 as Flint Mountain FC and joined the North East Wales League. They played on a number of pitches in and around Flint before playing at Northop Hall Pavilion, home of Northop Hall Ladies team. The 2018–19 season was one of great success for the club as they claimed the North East Wales League title and the North East Wales FA Horace Wynne Cup, as part of a quadruple-winning season. They moved into the Welsh National League (Wrexham Area) football system the following season as on the back of their promotion as champions.

Prior to the 2019–20 season commencing, Flint Mountain announced they would be moving once more, from the Northop Hall Pavilion to Halkyn United’s old pitch, Pant Newydd. As a result of the relocation, the team changed its name to Halkyn & Flint Mountain to acknowledge the move to Pentre Halkyn.

The club joined the newly formed North East Wales Football League in 2020 as a Premier Division club.  In May 2022 they announced they would be moving ground to groundshare Cae-y-Castell, home of Flint Town United.

On 9 June 2022, it was announced that the club had been promoted to the tier 3 Ardal NW League for the 2022–23 season. The following day the team announced that after approval from the North East Wales Football Association, the club had reverted to its previous name of Flint Mountain Football Club with immediate effect.

Squad

Honours

The Sovereign Trophies Auxiliary Cup - Winners: 2011-12
North East Wales Premier Division – Runners-up: 2021–22
North East Wales League - Champions: 2018–19
North East Wales FA Junior (Horace Wynne) Cup – Winners: 2018–19
North East Wales FA Junior (Horace Wynne) Cup – Runners-up: 2014–15
Presidents Cup – Winners: 2018–19
Presidents Cup – Runners-up: 2014–15
Mike Beech Memorial Trophy – Winners: 2018–19
Premier Cup – Runners-up: 2018–19

External links
Club official website

References

Football clubs in Wales
North East Wales Football League clubs
Association football clubs established in 2009
2009 establishments in Wales
Sport in Flintshire
Clwyd East Football League clubs
Ardal Leagues clubs